The Fairey Hendon was a British monoplane, heavy bomber of the Royal Air Force, designed by Fairey Aviation in the late 1920s. The aircraft served in small numbers with one squadron of the RAF between 1936 and 1939. It was the first all-metal low-wing monoplane to enter service with the RAF.

Development
The Hendon was built to meet the Air Ministry Specification B.19/27 for a twin-engine night bomber to replace the Vickers Virginia, competing against the Handley Page Heyford and Vickers Type 150. To meet this requirement, Fairey designed a low-winged cantilever monoplane with a fixed tailwheel undercarriage. The fuselage had a steel tube structure with fabric covering with a pilot, a radio operator/navigator and three gunners, in open nose, dorsal and tail positions. Bombs were carried in a bomb bay in the fuselage centre. Variants powered by either radial engines or liquid-cooled V12 engines were proposed.

The prototype K1695 (which was known as the Fairey Night Bomber until 1934) first flew on 25 November 1930, from Fairey's Great West Aerodrome in Heathrow and was powered by two 460 hp (340 kW) Bristol Jupiter VIII radial engines. The prototype crashed and was severely damaged in March 1931 and was rebuilt with two Rolls-Royce Kestrel VI engines. After trials, 14 production examples named the Hendon Mk.II were ordered. These were built by Fairey's Stockport factory in late 1936 and early 1937 and flown from Barton Aerodrome, Manchester. Orders for a further sixty Hendons were cancelled in 1936, as the prototype of the first of the next generation of British heavy bombers—the Armstrong Whitworth Whitley—had flown and showed much higher performance. The Hendon Mk.II was powered by two Rolls-Royce Kestrel VI engines. The production Hendon Mk.II included an enclosed cockpit for the pilot and navigator.

Operational history

The type was delayed by the crash and a rebuild of the prototype and the Heyford received the majority of the orders to replace RAF heavy bombers, the Hendon coming into service three years later. The only Hendon-equipped unit, 38 Squadron, began operational service at RAF Mildenhall in November 1936, replacing Heyfords, later moving to RAF Marham, Norfolk. Later, the Hendons went to 15 Squadron, which was formed from 38 Squadron. The type was soon obsolete and replaced from late 1938 by the Vickers Wellington. By January 1939, the Hendons had been retired and were then used for ground instruction work, including the radio school at RAF Cranwell.

Variants
 Hendon Mk.I
Prototype, one built
 Hendon Mk.II
Production variant with two Rolls-Royce Kestrel VI engines, 14 built

Operators
 Royal Air Force
 No. 38 Squadron RAF
 No. 115 Squadron RAF
 No. 1 Electrical & Wireless School RAF

Accidents and incidents
Of the 14 Hendon IIs only two were lost in accidents:
 December 1937 - K5091 crashed on landing at RAF Marham
 November 1938 - K5095 crashed at RAF Marham.

Specifications (Hendon II)

See also

References
Notes

Bibliography

 Crosby, Francis. The World Encyclopedia of Fighters and Bombers. London: Lorenz Books 
 Gallop, Alan. Time Flies: Heathrow At 60. Stroud: Sutton Publishing, 2005. 
 Mason, Francis K. The British Bomber since 1914. London: Putnam Aeronautical Books, 1994. 
 Taylor, H.A. Fairey Aircraft since 1915. London: Putnam, 1974. 
 Thetford, Owen. Aircraft of the Royal Airforce, 1918–1957. London: Putnam, 1957. 

1930s British bomber aircraft
Hendon
Low-wing aircraft
Aircraft first flown in 1930
Twin piston-engined tractor aircraft